Holy Family Convent Senior Secondary School is a school in Khurai city of Madhya Pradesh. It was established in 1976 as a pre-primary school, but within a year it re-established itself as a higher-secondary school.

Overview 
The institution is the branch of Shanti Dhara Province, Delhi of the Holy Family Congregation and provides education from kindergarten till Senior School. There are 45 classrooms divided into particular sections, three computer labs, a library, an activity hall, Staff Room, Principal Room, office / counter and a wide stage. 

The compound of the school is untouched with greenery.

References
 School Profile School Profile

Khurai
High schools and secondary schools in Madhya Pradesh